Bala Taleqan Rural District is a former administrative division of Taleqan District in Taleqan County, Alborz province, Iran.
At the 2006 census, its population was 6,609 in 1,932 households. The rural district had 31 villages, of which the largest was Dizan, with 570 inhabitants.

References 

Taleqan County

Rural Districts of Alborz Province

Populated places in Alborz Province

Populated places in Taleqan County

Settled areas of Elburz